Eliezer Shlomo Schick (May 29, 1940 – February 6, 2015), also known as Mohorosh (acronym for Moreinu HaRav Eliezer Shlomo, "Our teacher, our rabbi, Eliezer Shlomo", מוהרא"ש מברסלב) was a Hasidic rabbi and prolific author and publisher of Breslov teachings. He wrote and disseminated approximately 1,000 different pamphlets based on the teachings of Rebbe Nachman of Breslov. He was the founder and leader of the self-styled "Breslov City" in the Galilee town of Yavne'el, Israel, and had thousands of Hasidim around the world.

Early life

Eliezer Shlomo Schick was born in Jerusalem, Mandatory Palestine, to Rabbi Menachem Zev, the gaavad (head of the rabbinical court) of Tokay, Hungary, and his wife Malka. As a young boy, he learned in the Etz Chaim cheder. When he was a youth, his family relocated to New York City, where he studied in the Kashau yeshiva and then in Mesivtha Tifereth Jerusalem under Rabbi Moshe Feinstein.

At the age of 15, Schick came across the popular Breslov booklet Meshivat Nefesh by Rabbi Alter Tepliker, which attracted him to Rebbe Nachman's teachings. He began to spend many hours each day in hitbodedut per Rebbe Nachman's instructions, and studied more Torah in accordance with Rebbe Nachman's system of learning.

In 1962 he married Shifra Rotenberg, daughter of the Kossoner Rav, Rabbi Asher Yeshaya Halevi Rotenberg.

Breslov teacher
After his marriage, he began delivering shiurim in Hasidic thought to avreichim (married Torah students) and bochurim (unmarried men) in Boro Park, and began corresponding with students and others who sought his advice to strengthen their own religious observance.

In the 1970s Schick began writing small pamphlets distilling the lessons and teachings of Rebbe Nachman. He eventually authored, printed, and distributed approximately 1,000 titles in Hebrew, hundreds of which were translated into English. He also printed thousands of copies of Rebbe Nachman’s Likutei Moharan and Sippurei Maasiyos and sold them at cost price, popularizing Breslov teachings around the world. Among present-day Breslov leaders who were introduced to Breslov teachings through Schick's pamphlets was Rabbi Shalom Arush.

Additionally, Schick wrote dozens of sefarim, among them Erech Apayim (on anger management), Ilan Hachaim (on not wasting time), and commentaries on Rebbe Nachman's works.

Breslov leader

Beginning in the 1980s, Schick began visiting his Hasidim in Israel regularly, and established a synagogue in Safed. In 1985 he founded the Heichal Hakodesh Breslov community – largely consisting of baalei teshuvah (newly religious adherents) – in the Lower Galilee town of Yavne'el, Israel. This community, which calls itself "Breslov City", numbered nearly 400 families as of 2015, representing 30 percent of the town's population. The community maintains its own schools and civic organizations, including a Talmud Torah, girls' school, yeshiva ketana, yeshiva gedola, kollel, and chesed and tzedaka organizations. A large beis medrash (study/prayer hall) was completed in 2012.

Schick was known for encouraging early marriage among his adherents, conducting weddings in Yavne'el for girls aged 16 and younger, in violation of Israeli law.

Schick divided his time between his homes in Yavne'el and Boro Park. He also established synagogues in Monsey, Monroe, and Williamsburg, and spoke at them frequently. He had thousands of Hasidim around the world.

Schick also established a Yeshiva "Tifereth Hatorah" in Williamsburg for Breslover students, led by Rabbi Yoel Roth.

Final years
In April 2012, Schick suffered a heart attack and underwent surgery, from which he recovered. In 2015 he was treated for the final stages of leukemia at Memorial Sloan Kettering Cancer Center in New York City, where he died on February 6, 2015. He was buried in Yavne'el.
 
Schick left more than 120 volumes of responsa, consisting of nearly 75,000 letters and other unpublished writings. The collection is known as Shailos U'teshuvos Asher B'Nachal.

Notes

External links
Breslev-City - Official website of Mesivta Heichal Hakodesh
Official YouTube channel

Breslov rabbis
American Hasidic rabbis
Hasidic rabbis in Israel
20th-century rabbis in Jerusalem
21st-century rabbis in Jerusalem
20th-century American rabbis
People from Borough Park, Brooklyn
1940 births
2015 deaths